Psychoides is a genus of moths belonging to the family Tineidae. The type species is Psychoides verhuella, first described by Charles Bruand in 1853. Bruand also erected the genus.

Ecology
The moths fly during the day and resemble the Incurvariidae, in which family P. filicivora was first described. They have a flat body and wings are held in a tent-like position. The Psychoides are unusual amongst the Tineidae with the larvae feeding on green plants, i.e. ferns instead of fungi, lichen or dry animal or plant debris.

Species
Psychoides are distributed in the Oriental and Palaearctic regions. Only four species are known, with the P. gosari being added to the list in 2007 following the discovery of pupae in Korea from 2004 to 2006.

 Psychoides filicivora (Meyrick, 1937) 
 Psychoides gosari Kim & Bae, 2007 
 Psychoides phaedrospora Meyrick, 1935) 
 Psychoides verhuella Bruand, 1853

References

Bibliography

External links

Tineidae genera
Tineidae
Taxa named by Charles Théophile Bruand d'Uzelle